USS Rexburg (EPCE(R)-855) was built as a PCE(R)-848-class rescue escort patrol craft for the United States Navy during World War II. She was unnamed until 1956. After working through the 1950s and 60s as an oceanographic research vessel for the Navy Electronics Laboratory, Rexburg was decommissioned in 1970 and sold to the Church of Scientology as MV Excaliber.

History
After completing shakedown training in the Gulf of Mexico in January 1945, the unnamed PCE(R)-855 transited the Panama Canal to join the Pacific Fleet. Although equipped with anti-submarine weapons for escort duty, she was used as a small hospital and tasked with rescue work during the battle of Okinawa, where she was credited with rescuing four-hundred sailors.

As helicopters proved more capable for rescue work after World War II, eight surviving rescue escort patrol craft were given other assignments. PCE(R)-855 was assigned to the Navy Electronics Laboratory at San Diego on 15 February 1946. On 7 June 1946 she was redesignated EPCER-855 and underwent alterations at Long Beach Naval Shipyard that enhanced her suitability for service as a laboratory research ship.

She was given the name Rexburg in 1955 and in October 1959 came under the operational control of Operational Test and Evaluation Force, Pacific Projects Division, conducting electronic, communications, navigational, and underwater sound experiments until decommissioned on 2 March 1970. Before the ship was sold, the Navy removed the ship's bell for use at the Naval and Marine Corps Reserve Training Center in Denver.

References 

PCE(R)-848-class patrol craft
Ships built in Chicago
1944 ships